Komo is a town in Hela Province, Papua New Guinea. It has a 3200 m private airstrip, Komo Airfield (AYXM), which services ExxonMobil's Hides gas field.

References

Populated places in Enga Province